James Phillip Austin (December 8, 1879 – March 6, 1965) was a Welsh professional baseball player and coach. He played in Major League Baseball as a third baseman for the New York Highlanders and St. Louis Browns from 1909 through 1923, 1925 through 1926, and 1929. He also managed the Browns in 1913, 1918, and 1923.

Early years
Austin was born in Swansea, Wales, the son of a shipbuilder. He was one of only three Major League Baseball players to be born in Wales (the others being pitcher Ted Lewis and infielder Peter Morris). His father moved to the United States in 1885 to find work, and Austin followed in 1887. He did not see a baseball game until he was 14 years old.

After leaving school in 1889, Austin became an apprentice machinist with Westinghouse. After finishing his four-year apprenticeship, Westinghouse went on strike. Austin took up an offer of $40 a month ($), plus a job, to play independent ball in Warren, Ohio.

Professional baseball
Austin remained in Dayton until , when he was sold to Omaha in the Western League. That year, Austin became immortalized in the Charles M. Conlon photo as the third baseman trying to avoid Ty Cobb's spikes on a stolen base. Of the play, Austin said, "That's Cobb sliding into third and the other guy is me."

In , when the Browns' player-manager George Stovall was suspended by the American League for spitting at an umpire, Austin was made manager on a temporary basis, until he was replaced by the legendary Branch Rickey. It was Rickey's first managerial job. Austin continued as Rickey's "Sunday Manager" – Rickey had promised his mother that he would not enter a ballpark on the Christian Sabbath, and therefore Austin managed the Browns on those days.

Austin played regularly for the Browns until , and served as a coach for another 20 years. Unfortunately, the Browns during this period were rarely ever in the first division, so his team won no pennants during his playing career. The Browns did however finish the 1922 season in second place, one game behind the New York Yankees. Austin did also have the great fortune of either playing for or coaching baseball greats Branch Rickey, George Sisler, and Rogers Hornsby. In , at the age of 49, Austin became one of the oldest major leaguers in history when he was inserted into a blowout. He cleanly handled two chances at third base, and struck out in his only at bat.

Later life
Austin spent 16 seasons as a coach for the Browns and Chicago White Sox during an 18-year span that ended in 1940. After his coaching career ended, Austin retired and moved to Laguna Beach, California, and served as the town's mayor during the 1940s.

Austin was one of the ballplayers who told his story in Lawrence Ritter's classic 1966 book, The Glory of Their Times, from which much of the information in this article came.

Managerial record

See also
List of Major League Baseball career stolen bases leaders
List of Major League Baseball player-managers

References

External links

1879 births
1965 deaths
Baseball coaches from Nebraska
Baseball players from Nebraska
Baseball coaches from Ohio
Chicago White Sox coaches
Dayton Veterans players
Major League Baseball player-managers
Major League Baseball players from the United Kingdom
Major League Baseball players from Wales
Welsh baseball players
Major League Baseball third basemen
New York Highlanders players
Omaha Rourkes players
Sportspeople from Swansea
St. Louis Browns coaches
St. Louis Browns managers
St. Louis Browns players